Bâlteni is a commune in Gorj County, Oltenia, Romania. It is composed of five villages: Bâlteni, Cocoreni, Moi, Peșteana-Jiu, and Vlăduleni.

Natives
Vasile Roaită (1914–1933), railway worker

References

See also
Bălteni (disambiguation)

Communes in Gorj County
Localities in Oltenia